"Take Back Home Girl" is a duet song recorded by American country music singer Chris Lane and American pop singer Tori Kelly. The song, Lane's third release for Big Loud Records, is also the lead single to his second studio album Laps Around the Sun (2018). It was written by Hillary Lindsey, David Garcia and Josh Miller. "Take Back Home Girl" peaked at numbers eight and 12 on the Billboard Country Airplay and Hot Country Songs charts respectively. It also reached number 55 on the Hot 100 chart. The song was certified Platinum by the Recording Industry Association of America (RIAA), and has sold 150,000 units as of July 2018. It achieved similar chart success in Canada, reaching number 14 on the Canada Country chart and number 79 on the Canadian Hot 100. The accompanying music video for the single was directed by Justin Clough.

Background and development
"Take Back Home Girl" was written by Hillary Lindsey, David Garcia and Josh Miller. The song is a "soulful ode to those girls you can bring home to mom", and Rolling Stone described it as a "grooving, R&B-centric country track." Lane said when asked for an artist with whom he would like to record a duet, Tori Kelly was his first choice. Kelly said that, after being sent a demo of the song by her manager, she liked it so much that she was willing to record duet vocals on it before she had even been told with which artist she would be collaborating.

Commercial performance
"Take Back Home Girl" reached number 12 on the Billboard Hot Country Songs chart dated April 14, 2018. That same week, it debuted at number 92 on the Hot 100 chart before leaving the next week. On the week of June 16, the song reappeared on the chart at number 100 and moved up to number 99 the week of June 23 before leaving the week after.
 It made its second reappearance at number 98 on the week of July 7 and peaked at number 55 the week of August 11, staying on the chart for twelve weeks. It has sold 1.2M equivalents in the United States as of January 2018.

In Canada, the song debuted at number 81 on the Canadian Hot 100 chart dated July 21, 2018. It peaked at number 79 the week of July 28 and dropped nineteen spots to number 98 the week after before leaving the chart completely.

Music video
Justin Clough directed the song's music video, which premiered in November 2017.

Live performances
Lane and Kelly first performed "Take Back Home Girl" live on The Tonight Show Starring Jimmy Fallon on April 2, 2018. The duo performed it again on NBC's Today on July 17.

Charts

Weekly charts

Year-end charts

Certifications

References

2017 singles
2017 songs
Chris Lane songs
Tori Kelly songs
Big Loud singles
Male–female vocal duets
Song recordings produced by Joey Moi
Songs written by Hillary Lindsey
Songs written by David Garcia (musician)